The Carolina Panthers are a professional American football club based in Charlotte, North Carolina. They play  the southern division of the National Football Conference (NFC), one of the two conferences in the National Football League (NFL). On October 26, 1993, NFL owners unanimously selected Carolina as the 29th NFL franchise and the first expansion team since 1976. Carolina Panthers Owner/Founder Jerry Richardson,  became just the second former player to own an NFL team along with George Halas of the Chicago Bears. The Panthers lost Super Bowl 50 to Denver Broncos after a 15-1 season.

Kicker John Kasay is the longest-tenured player, having participated in 221 games over his 15 seasons with the team. Kasay is one of eight players who have played in at least 150 games with the team, and holds team records for most career field goals made and points scored. Offensive tackle Jordan Gross holds the team record for most starts (167); Wide receiver Steve Smith ranks second in team starts (161), third in games played (182), and holds numerous team records for receiving and kick/punt returns. Sam Mills, who started 48 games with the team from 1995 to 1997, is the only player to have had his number (#51) retired by the team. Three Panthers have been inducted into the Pro Football Hall of Fame: Reggie White, who played just one season (2000) for the team; Kevin Greene, who played three seasons (1996, 1998, and 1999.) and Sam Mills, who played from 1995-1997.

List of players
This list contains all players who have played in 32 games (the equivalent of two NFL seasons) or started in 16 regular season games (the equivalent of one NFL season) for the Carolina Panthers; pre-season and playoff games are excluded from this count. A player is considered to have played a game if they have been part of the team's 53-man active roster for that game.

General references

Notes
Notes

Footnotes

Carolina Panthers players
Car
Players